Jacob Robert Poscoliero (born 11 April 1990) is an Australian footballer who plays as a central defender/defensive midfielder for South Coast Flame FC.

Club career

Central Coast Mariners
On 8 October 2014, Poscoliero joined the Central Coast Mariners in the A-League. Poscoliero made his senior debut 10 days later, in Central Coast Mariners' 2–1 loss to Wellington Phoenix.

Perth Glory
On 18 May 2017, Poscoliero transferred to Perth Glory.

On 30 January 2018, Perth Glory released Poscoliero after he played only eight times.

Return to Central Coast Mariners
A day after his release from Perth Glory, Poscoliero returned to previous club Central Coast Mariners. At the end of the season, Poscoliero's contract expired and wasn't renewed.

Honours
Blacktown City
 National Premier Leagues NSW: 2014
 Waratah Cup: 2014

See also 
 List of Central Coast Mariners FC players

References

External links
 

1990 births
Living people
Association football defenders
Australian soccer players
Bassano Virtus 55 S.T. players
Blacktown City FC players
Sydney United 58 FC players
National Premier Leagues players
Central Coast Mariners FC players
Perth Glory FC players
A-League Men players
Australian people of Italian descent